This is a list of the Sites of Special Scientific Interest (SSSIs) in the Torfaen Area of Search (AoS).

Sites
 Blorenge
 Henllys Bog
 Llandegfedd Reservoir
 Tyr Hen Forwyn

References

Torfaen
Torfaen